HD 214448 is a binary star system in the equatorial constellation of Aquarius. They orbit each other with a period of around 147 years. The combined mass of the pair is twice that of the Sun.

References

External links
 Image HD 214448

Aquarius (constellation)
214448
Binary stars
K-type giants
8612
Durchmusterung objects
111761